Flushing Township may refer to:

 Flushing Township, Michigan
 Flushing Township, Belmont County, Ohio

Township name disambiguation pages